The men's 1500 metres event at the 2017 European Athletics Indoor Championships was held on 3 March 2017 at 19:15 (heats) and on 4 March 20:18 (final) local time.

Medalists

Records

Results

Heats
Qualification: First 2 in each heat (Q) and the next 3 fastest (q) advance to the Final.

Final

References

2017 European Athletics Indoor Championships
1500 metres at the European Athletics Indoor Championships